Mount Schutz is a mountain rising at the east side of the head of Noll Glacier in the Wilson Hills, Antarctica. Mapped by United States Geological Survey (USGS) from surveys and U.S. Navy air photos, 1960–63. Named by Advisory Committee on Antarctic Names (US-ACAN) for Lieutenant Commander Albert C. Schutz, Jr., U.S. Navy, Aircraft Commander in LC-117D and Co-pilot in LC-130F aircraft during Operation Deep Freeze 1967 and 1968.

Mountains of Oates Land